Raven is a superheroine appearing in American comic books published by DC Comics. The character first appeared in a special insert in DC Comics Presents #26 (October 1980), and was created by writer Marv Wolfman and artist George Pérez. A cambion daughter of a demon father (Trigon) and human mother (Arella), Raven is a powerful empath who can sense emotions and control her "soul-self", which can fight physically, as well as act as Raven's eyes and ears away from her physical body; more recently, she has been depicted as being adept with various types of magic and sorcery. She is a prominent member of the superhero team Teen Titans. The character also goes by the alias Rachel Roth as a false civilian name.
 
Raven has appeared in numerous cartoon television shows and films, including as one of the Teen Titans in Cartoon Network's eponymous series, voiced by Tara Strong, and in the 2014–2020 DC Animated Movie Universe, voiced by Taissa Farmiga. Rachel Roth makes her live adaptation debut in the DC Universe and HBO Max series Titans, portrayed by Teagan Croft.

Development
In an interview, Perez described his design approach for the character. "taking the cue that Raven was very mysterious à la Phantom Stranger, I took that as a starting point, and using the shadow face where half her face is always in shadow despite the lighting, was a shtick I obviously got from Phantom Stranger, who also had the same deal. He had a long billowing cape, as did she, and in her case since her name was Raven, I decided to create a silhouette for her that would look like a bird. The hood was designed so that in the profile it would end up looking like a birds head, so that when her soul self came out, since that was done in full black, it looked like a gigantic black Raven. Her name and the Phantom Stranger were key to how I designed her."

Perez was asked if the characters face was based on any real life person, Perez stated the following, "Originally Raven was Persis Khambatta, the actress who played in the first Star Trek film, and later became a young lady named Fran Macgregor, who was a dancer, and I used some of her features, particularly for her figure, for Raven."

Fictional character biography

First life of Raven
Raven initially approached the Justice League for help, but they refused her on the advice of Zatanna, who sensed her demonic parentage. In desperation, she reformed the Teen Titans as the New Teen Titans to fight her father. The team consisted of Robin, Kid Flash, Wonder Girl, Starfire, Cyborg, and Beast Boy (then known as Changeling). Raven and her new friends later came to think of one another as family.

Trigon soon took Raven to his home dimension. The Titans defeated Trigon and sealed him in an interdimensional prison with the help of Arella, who stayed at the interdimensional door as Trigon's Guardian. However, Raven continued to fight her father's influence, and her face started changing. For a period of time, Raven lost control several times in stressful situations, but managed to regain control before Trigon could assert himself.

Eventually, Trigon escaped his prison and destroyed Azarath, came to Earth, and took control of Raven. The Titans were manipulated to unfriend Raven, thereby allowing the souls of Azarath contained inside the ring of Azar to possess her and use her as a channel to kill Trigon. After this battle, Raven rose from the ashes, cleansed of Trigon's evil, and vanished.

Raven
After Raven's disappearance, Arella went around the world in search of Raven. She tracked Raven down, but both of them were kidnapped by Brother Blood.  The minions of Brother Blood used Raven to control Nightwing (formerly Robin) as part of Blood's plans. The Titans rescued them both and prevented Brother Blood from returning to power.

As a result of the defeat of Trigon, Raven was free to experience emotions for the first time in her life. Raven found she was able to not only sense, but control others' emotions. She learned to handle this power only after unintentionally making The Flash believe that he loved her when she thought that she was in love with him. Raven also fostered a relationship with technopath Eric Forrester, who was using the life force of women he seduced to regain some of his lost humanity. Forrester knew that Raven's soul-self could help him to permanently retain his humanity. This attempt was cut short by the intervention of Joseph Wilson (Jericho), who helped Raven overcome her love for Forrester by destroying Forrester and saving Raven.

Raven was later kidnapped by the Wildebeest Society during the "Titans Hunt" storyline. The Wildbeest, led by the Trigon-possessed souls of Azarath, were going to use several Titans to bring about the return of Trigon. During a massive battle, Raven was possessed by the evil souls and once again became the evil doppelgänger of her father. Arella, along with Danny Chase, used the power of Azar's soul to cleanse Raven. In the aftermath, Raven's body was destroyed, and Arella and Danny sacrificed themselves and joined the cleansed souls of Azarath to become Phantasm.

Evil Raven
Raven appeared possessed by her evil conscience and attempted to implant Trigon's seed into new bodies. She interrupted Nightwing and Starfire's wedding and implanted a seed of Trigon into Starfire. Instead of corrupting her, she actually implanted the soul of the good Raven. This caused Starfire to leave Earth to escape from the evil Raven. The Titans were able to defeat Raven only because of the help they received from Phantasm.

Raven later returned, still evil, to destroy the good version of herself implanted in Starfire. With the help of the Titans, evil Raven was reduced to ashes, and the good part of Raven was given a new, golden spirit body, which was completely free of her father's demonic influence. In New Tamaran, Starfire and the golden spirit form of Raven revealed that implanting Raven's soul in Starfire was actually her plan to get rid of her demonic soul.

Spirit
In her bodiless spirit form, Raven returned to Earth to help extract Cyborg's soul and consciousness from the Technis planet's computer mind. Later, she was instrumental in defeating Imperiex by aiding Wonder Woman and Tempest in re-powering Darkseid. As a spirit, Raven wandered the Earth, looking for her place in the world.

Rebirth
While the spirit of Raven was looking for her place in the world, Brother Blood came to claim her. Her spirit was instilled into the body of a teenage girl by the Church of Blood. The Teen Titans (reformed again), discovered that the Church of Blood were worshipers of Raven's father, Trigon. They also found a prophecy which told of the marriage between Brother Blood and Raven that would result in Armageddon. The new team interrupted the wedding, and Raven forced the cult to escape. She then joined the new Teen Titans and enrolled at a high school as Rachel Roth, using her mother's original surname.

After her rebirth and much confusion about her new place reborn in the world, Raven's teammate Garfield Logan (Beast Boy), began developing romantic feelings for her, and the two became romantically attached.

52
In 52, after the death of Superboy, the Titans began to fall apart. Robin joins Batman, and Wonder Girl left the team. Beast Boy struggled to maintain the team and was flippant towards Raven and their relationship, and the new members who joined were only interested in seeking fame and honor rather than actually looking to fulfill justice. When Beast Boy decided to help Steel on a mission, most of the members left, leaving only Raven and Zatara. Later, Beast Boy, Raven, Offspring and Aquagirl aid Steel in launching an attack on LexCorp. Raven also participated in World War III. Eventually, Robin, Wonder Girl, and a few new members join the Titans, making the team whole again. Beast Boy and Raven were among the only members that remained in the team during this period.

"One Year Later"

Raven quits the team after she and Beast Boy end their relationship. Letting the others think she is leaving because of Garfield, Raven actually leaves because she has uncovered a secret of one of the other Titans.

Raven takes advantage of this power with a book of unclear significance. Raven has a diskette containing Jericho's soul. She performs a cleansing ritual over his soul and transfers it into a new body before returning to the team as a full member.

Without warning, the Titans are captured by the villainous Titans East and transported to the original Titan Island in New York City, where Raven is placed in the "care" of Enigma and Duela Dent, who took to torturing her psychologically. Raven manages her escape. After beating the Titans East, she and Garfield talk about their feelings, but he refuses to dwell on the matter, leaving their relationship uncertain.

Following the death of Bart Allen, Raven, along with the other adult Titans, decides to leave the team. Raven decides to pursue her chance at attending high school, having never had the opportunity before.

Raven stars in a five-issue miniseries written by Marv Wolfman, with art by Damion Scott. It takes place during the missing year, following Raven's attempts at living as a normal teenage girl and attending high school. Unfortunately, she gets inadvertently drawn into a mystical fight involving the Medusa Mask and has to battle for the lives of her classmates. In the Wizard #177 magazine, Wolfman briefly described the series, saying, "She needs to be on her own and in charge of herself for the first time in her life. This is more than just a 'tale of Raven'; it sets up her new life".

Titans
Raven discovers that Trigon had more than one child, her half-siblings, and that a trio of children devoted to her father are behind the attacks. She is affected along with many of the other Titans by these three beings. Raven's three half-brothers use her and Beast Boy as keys to open a portal to Trigon's realm. Raven uses her own power to influence greed in others to make her half-brothers steal what little power Trigon had left. The portal is closed and Trigon's sons, believing they have gained great power, leave.

Raven's half-brothers later return and provoke her demonic side, causing her to leave the Titans and join them. However, the team was able to track them down and convince Raven to join the side of good once more. She later provided a number of other artefacts, all capable of killing her, to the Titans as terms for her staying with the team.

Wyld
Battered and dazed, Raven arrived at Titans Tower, where she was rescued by the newest roster of Teen Titans. While she was recovering, Beast Boy stated that he was still in love with her and would remain so, despite whatever difficulties were involved.

Raven decided to stay with the Teen Titans, now acting as a mentor to the younger members. When the Teen Titans attempted to return home, Raven was kidnapped and taken to another dimension by Wyld. Wyld reveals that Raven was the one who created him. When Raven was traveling dimensions looking for her father, her soul self caused all of the animals she visited to merge into one being: the Wyld. The Titans enter the Wyld World to rescue Raven. Wyld is eventually destroyed by Static.

In the final issue of this incarnation of the Titans, Superboy-Prime and his Legion of Doom attack Titan's Tower. Raven stops Kid Flash just before he can kill Inertia. Then she reveals her soul-self to Headcase, terrifying and in so defeating him. After the Legion of Doom is defeated and Superboy-Prime is bound to the Source Wall, Beast Boy and Raven have a talk about her difficulty in reading Solstice's emotions after Beast Boy had accused Raven of leaving her behind and he refused to believe her when she stated it wasn't on purpose. They also talked of their encounter with Headcase. Eventually, Raven starts to open up about her true feelings. Beast Boy makes it clear he doesn't want to escape from any part of her. Touched, Raven decides that she needs to embrace the positive feelings inside her rather than just her negative ones. Beast Boy assures her this is part of being human, and points out, "I think you've worried enough about the bad...so why don't we focus on the good for a change?" With that, the two reconcile and share a heartfelt kiss.

The New 52

After the events of the 2011 "Flashpoint" series, the history of the DC Universe was altered, resulting in The New 52. Raven makes her New 52 debut in the first issue of the Phantom Stranger. There she is shown as a girl in a black and white striped sweater becoming distraught at a funeral over the level of overwhelming emotion that is emanating from the people there. The Phantom Stranger takes Raven to Stonehenge, the portal between Earth and the realm of Trigon. Being told by a "higher power" what must be done, the reluctant Stranger unwillingly hands her over to Trigon.

Teen Titans 
Raven makes her first Teen Titans appearance in Teen Titans vol. 4 #16. Raven, sporting a new costume, is introduced by Trigon as his "Black Bird of Terror" to his minions. It is strongly suggested that Raven has been controlling Robin's emotions. During Trigon's invasion on Earth, she approaches a near dead Beast Boy who had been assaulted by Deathstroke earlier in the remains of the Ravagers facility. After being touched by Raven, Beast Boy awakens and when he asks if Harvest has sent her, she apologizes stating that she brought him into the fray much sooner than she expected, and says, "Hush. We are birds of a feather now... You are mine to control", as Raven mind-controls him and teleports them to New York where Trigon and the Teen Titans are in battle.

Raven's origins revisited 
Trigon reveals more of Raven's origins. He has had a son from each of the other worlds he's conquered, but Raven is his only daughter. Trigon let Raven's mother, Arella, live because he considered that Raven needed to be raised by humans so she could recreate the seven under-realms in her own image. Arella fled with her daughter to Azarath where the monks taught her how to control her dark side and avoid Trigon's influence on her. Years later, she escaped from Azarath to protect her mentors and planet from Trigon and fled to the Earth where Phantom Stranger captured her for Trigon.

Raven spent time in the under-realms where time flows faster or was compressed. Trigon thought he only needed to liberate her and not control her to make Raven have her own image. Apparently impressed, Trigon handed her the Throne of the Under-realms to rule the place as Queen.

Return of Trigon 
Back in New York, Trigon's three sons, Belial, Ruskoff, and Suge, assault the Teen Titans to take Raven back. Raven, Beast Boy, and the Titans defeat them, but Trigon himself appears again and takes control of the Titans save for Red Robin, Raven and Beast Boy. The manipulated Titans attack, and while Raven and Beast Boy distract them and Trigon, Tim cuts through Trigon's eyes with his inertrite wings. Trigon, pulling out the wings from his eyes, compliments Tim before suddenly disappearing. Soon after, a woman and a group of suited men come through a portal, informing that they will take Psimon into custody and make the incident appear as if it had never happened. When questioned about the police officers Psimon has killed, the woman reveals it has been a hallucination by Trigon, so therefore it has never happened.

Raven and Beast Boy are re-accepted into the Teen Titans. Raven brings controversy to the team by revealing the flirtatious relationships Tim had when under Trigon's control. Raven goes into her room, leaving the awkward situation behind. There, she summons her father, saying, "Father, I am one of them. Your plan worked perfectly", leaving questions on what side she is really playing for.

Meanwhile, Tim calls Raven aside, telling that if something happens to him, the team will look up to her to lead them.

Forever Evil 
After the events of "Trinity War", the Earth's greatest heroes are gone and the Crime Syndicate of America has taken over the world. The Teen Titans challenge the Crime Syndicate, but are easily overpowered by Johnny Quick and Atomica and then flung into the time stream. While the Titans are constantly flung through time, Raven is sent a few thousand years back in time. There, she is challenged by Etrigan the Demon, who recognizes her as Trigon's daughter and tries to kill her. Raven is saved by Wonder Girl, who suggests that the way to stop Raven's powers, since she was born and raised in a world between worlds, is to manipulate the energy within the time stream. Raven succeeds in anchoring the Titans with her soul-self, teleporting them through time.

The Titans arrive 20 years into the future, where the son of Superman, Jon Lane Kent, has massacred most of Earth's superheroes, leaving only a few, including Beast Boy (Garfield Logan), now calling himself Beast Man, and Rose Wilson. Superboy Kon-El and Jon battle, and Kon triumphs. But Kon is sent elsewhere by an unknown power, and a severely injured Jon is swapped unknowingly as Superboy by Logan and Wilson. The Titans depart again, now to an alien planet in the 30th century, where Kid Flash is actually a rebel leader and war criminal, Bar Torr. While the Titans stay to witness the Trial of Kid Flash, Raven deduces Superboy is actually Jon, and helps send him back to the present time so that he can find a cure for his deteriorating body condition.

Leaving Kid Flash and Solstice in the future, the Titans return to their original time and are united with Bunker, Beast Boy, and Skitter. Raven finds out that their journey has severed Trigon's control over her. Followed by an attack by the villain Grimm, the Titans plan a final attack on Harvest's new colony. Raven is reluctant to join because of her past actions, but Bunker tells her that everybody deserves a second chance, and Raven changes her mind. In the colony, they are surprised to find that everyone is returned to normal, and even the victims of the Culling have been restored to life. Raven plays a crucial role by finding out Harvest's scheme to extract all the metagenes to create a massive DNA strand for his usage. This is destroyed by Raven's soul-self and Harvest is finally defeated.

Rebirth
Some time after leaving the Teen Titans, Raven set out to learn more about her human relatives in San Francisco. Raven attempted to conceal her powers before having a misadventure and then later abducted by Damian Wayne who recruited her to be part of the new Teen Titans team he was establishing to take down his grandfather Ra's al Ghul. It is then revealed that the Demon's Fist, a team initially led by Damian before he decided to follow Batman, were hunting each of the assembled Titans that Damian had abducted for their initiation into the League of Assassins. Raven turns out to be the target of the assassin by the name of Plague, whose hands can rot, decay and take the life out of anything she touches.

Powers and abilities
The daughter of the cosmic demon, Trigon, Raven inherited his power, making her an extremely powerful demon in her own right and is granted both immense magical and psychic powers. In her earlier appearance, her powers are said to be strong enough to destroy a universe if left unchecked. In more recent stories, she is seemingly the most powerful of Trigon's offspring, and her power was compared to the demon lord Neron, to whom she is stated to be superior, and the latter character portrayed as accepting this as fact.

Primarily an empath, Raven can sense both pain and disease and remove them (in her earlier appearances), assimilating them into her own body and expunging them, but at a cost of great physical pain. She can also read the emotions of others and control them, also granting her telepathic-like insight into their minds. She can also induce calmness, suppress negativity, and even make someone fall in love with her. By absorbing the pain of the wounded into herself, she can induce rapid healing for the injured person.

In addition to her psychic-related powers, she is considered highly adept in the mystical arts, which partly is connected to her soul-self. She is capable of a plethora of abilities through magic, including teleportation, time travel, manipulation of shadows and darkness, hypnosis, telekinesis, and chaos magic through her soul-self (a variant of magic in DC Comics capable of performing magical acts without following a system [e.g., incantations, chants, etc.]).

Like her brothers, Raven can induce and amplify one of the seven deadly sins (in her case, pride) or all seven of them, in any living being; however, doing so will cause her to suffer spells of nausea and vomiting for several days afterward as side effects. Raven also has limited precognition, which allows her to predict future events that are about to happen, although this happens involuntarily and infrequently. She has also been shown to be an excellent hand-to-hand combatant, although she rarely uses these abilities.

Soul Self 
Raven can also astrally project a solid black energy form that takes the shape of a bird, called her soul-self. Her soul-self can travel long distances, become intangible, and is able to telepathically communicate. It can act as a shield as it can absorb a limited amount of energy and solid matter, regurgitating them before reintegrating with Raven. Using her soul-self, she can convert her physical body into her soul-self and carry or teleport herself and others over a limited distance. Her soul-self can mentally subdue at least one person by enveloping them inside of itself. Raven's soul-self could initially stay outside her body for exactly five minutes; failure to reintegrate in time would cause mental torment for her, though she eventually overcame this limitation.

Weaknesses 
Raven possesses a few weaknesses to her abilities: as an empath, she is unable to completely disconnect herself from other's emotions, being around too many people with heightened emotions can pose a risk to her. Raven is also susceptible to overwhelming mystical forces.

Collected editions
Raven

Raven: Daughter of Darkness

Other versions 
 Rachel Roth/Raven is featured in the Smallville Season 11 digital comic based on the TV series. In the story-arc "Harbinger", Blood and his cult targeted and plan to sacrifice teenager Rachel Roth but thwarted by John Constantine and Zatanna. She later joins the Teen Titans. 
 A radically different version of Raven exists in Teen Titans: Earth One. Born in the New Mexico Ramah Navajo Reservation, she has prophetic dreams of the Titans after encountering a crashed Tamaranean starship. She later joins the team. 
 In The Books of Magic Annual #3, a version of the Teen Titans can be seen in Timothy Hunter's alternative reality. Raven's counterpart is named "Moonchild", and is a sidekick to the Phantom Stranger.
 In the Titans Tomorrow storyline, Dark Raven, a future image of Raven, is a member of the Titans Tomorrow. She is referred to the "Wicked Witch of the West" due to consuming the emotions of most of the American continent to maintain peace.
 In Amalgam Comics, an amalgamation of Raven and Marvel's Aliya Dayspring is called Raveniya Dayspring.
 In the "Superman/Batman Mash-Up" universe, Doctor Destiny trapped Superman and Batman in a universe where there are amalgamations of a number of DC characters. Ravanna was an amalgamation of Raven and Zatanna, and was a deceased member of the Justice Titans. Her costume is kept as a memorial.
 In DC/Wildstorm: DreamWar, Raven appears along with the rest of the Wolfman/Perez-era Teen Titans as part of Chimera's dream-fueled plot to make Wildstorms, wherein normally very brutal heroes act like his dream heroes from the DC Universe. Initial appearance had the original Titans Tower appear out of nowhere on top of the Riker's Island prison facility. Mr. Majestic is sent in to investigate but is brought low by a Starbolt and a single touch from Raven before most of the Titans make their escape. She next appears alongside the other Teen Titans as they engage the members of Gen 13. As the heroes of DC, animated as they are, realize they are being used by Chimera and cease fighting and revert to a more cautious approach to the world around them, Chimera decides to dream up villains such as Doomsday to continue with his wishes before resorting to hatching a Sun-Eater inside the moon. While most of the capable heroes travel to the moon to prevent the Sun-Eater destroying it, Raven along with the Midnighter, independently of each other, deducts where Chimera was hiding through Edgar Allan Poe's Purloined Letter, both deducing that Chimera was hiding in plain sight. After a brief fight with the Shadow-Thief, brought low by a glimpse into Raven's mind, they eventually find the shrunken Chimera before waking him up, causing all of the DC characters to disappear, but leaving the damage behind.
 Raven is a major character in Tiny Titans, in which she lives at home with her father Trigon, who substitutes as a teacher at her school.
 In the Booster Gold series, Black Beetle has moved back in time to corrupt history. In battle between the Teen Titans against Deathstroke and the Ravager, Black Beetle kills the Titans save for Raven, who had shown up a moment after. Booster Gold, Skeets, and Rip Hunter arrive at the scene and tell Raven that history has been rampaged, and ask her to help them track down Black Beetle. Raven accompanies them to an alternate future where the New Teen Titans never existed and Trigon had taken over the earth. They track down Black Beetle but he escapes into the timestream. They return to the time of the battle with the Ravager and to correct the timestream. Booster knocks Deathstroke out, suits up in his armor, and replicates the scene. Before departing with Ravager's body, Booster tells Robin, "Embrace your heritage and guide Damian". Meanwhile, Raven plants false memories into Deathstroke's mind, so that he will forever blame the Titans for his son's death and will become the greatest adversary of the Teen Titans.
 In the alternate timeline of the Flashpoint storyline, Raven is a member of the Secret Seven, a group of powerful sorcerers of Earth. Raven, Zatanna, and Mindwarp are killed by Enchantress, who turns out to be a spy for the Amazon and has been ordered to infiltrate the Secret Seven. Enchantress is eventually killed by Superman. Curiously, Raven and Zatanna's relations to their fathers appear to have changed. 
 In the alternate Injustice Timeline, Raven's father Trigon appears during a fight between the Regime and Insurgency; he is under the impression that the Regime are responsible for Raven's disappearance, courtesy of John Constantine's manipulations. Raven is awoken from her enchanted sleep just as her father engages in a cosmic battle with Mister Mxyzptlk which threatens to engulf them all. Raven tries to reach her father, only for Doctor Fate to intervene and banish her father and the imp to another dimension, killing Trigon. Year Four sees Raven briefly securing herself in a pocket dimension where she is confused over her grief about her father's death, considering how much she detested him. She questions where she truly belongs due to her demon/human status. In Year Five, Superman visits Raven to rejoin the Regime. She rejoins in Chapter 34 by using her dark magic to blackout Earth's power and Insurgency's plan to expose Superman's crimes. She and Cyborg capture Deathstroke at S.T.A.R labs.
 In the DC Bombshells universe, Raven's mother was from Germany and fell in love with the beastly mountainous spirit, Das Trigon. Despite the hate she received from the other villagers from bearing Trigon's daughter, Azaria still raised Raven with care while teaching her some magic. After their village and townsfolk were killed by the Germans and Killer Frost, the Joker's Daughter took Raven in and forced her to use her magic to benefit the Third Reich. She initially appears when John Constantine and Zatanna (also victims of the Joker's Daughter) were cast into the ghetto, but was revealed to be Joker's Daughter in disguise who used Zatanna to know of the Bombshells' plans. Joker's Daughter then summons the real Raven (who's still under her control), to thwart the Bombshells against her will. However, some of her magic passes on to Miri Marvel, who works with Zatanna to break free of the Joker's Daughter's curse. She then works together with the Bombshells to defeat and depower the Joker's Daughter and her army.

In other media

Television

Live action

 Raven/Rachel Roth appears as one of the main characters of the TV series Titans, portrayed by Teagan Croft. After her "mother" was murdered by an unknown male assailant, teenager Rachel Roth displays her exceptionally strong telekinetic abilities out of sheer fury and flees town. She is quickly abducted and taken to the Detroit police station, where she meets police detective Dick Grayson/Robin, whom she recognizes from her nightmares, and asks for his aid. Robin eventually forms a team of heroes known as "Titans" to protect Rachel from her father and his acolytes such as the Nuclear Family while also training them to use her powers for good. In the Season 2 premiere, an empowered Rachel eventually defeats her father and imprisons him after Trigon successfully brainwashed the Titans alongside Jason Todd. 
 Raven appears in the final part of the Arrowverse crossover Crisis on Infinite Earths via archive footage from the episode "Titans".

Animation
Many of Raven's appearances are voiced by Tara Strong.
 A teenage version of Raven appears in the Teen Titans animated series. One of the program's breakout characters, she was so popular that later comic portayals made attempts to be closer to this version of her. This version's appearance is mostly the same as her comic counterpart, but her blue dress is replaced with a purple, hooded cloak and black leotard. Additionally, she has light gray skin, violet-blue eyes, and shoulder-length violet-blue hair. She also has a variety of powers, often accessed through the incantation "Azarath Metrion Zinthos", but mostly uses telekinesis that encases objects in dark mystical energy. Another of Raven's chief abilities is her "soul-self", which allows her to detach her soul and spirit from her body in the form of a dark-energy Raven. This ability can be used to enter the minds of others, teleport herself and others across great distances, pass through solid matter or through fire, and even alter her own appearance. Raven has displayed a number of seldom-used abilities. She can heal herself and others, stop time, and manifest her fears as monsters unintentionally. She keeps a library of numerous spell books in her room on the occult, as well as a number of magical charms and talismans. Raven's powers are entirely tied to her emotions, becoming more powerful and unstable with the intensity of the emotions fueling them, thus why she is the most emotionally restrained and stoic of the Titans. However, she eventually warms up to her teammates and comes to see them as her family. The fourth season serves as an adaptation of the "Terror of Trigon" arc in the Teen Titans comics, and has five episodes that focus heavily on Raven. Over the course of the season, Raven tries to avoid her destiny of becoming the portal that will release Trigon into their dimension. However, with Slade having been empowered by Trigon, Raven loses hope and resigns to her fate. She leaves her teammates with a small fraction of her powers to protect them from Trigon's petrification blast when he emerges. Raven regresses into a small five-year-old child, and is rescued from Trigon's prison by Robin. Robin and the other Titans decide to fight anyway, though they are ultimately incapable of defeating Trigon. Their efforts convince Raven to step out of her father's shadow, and she vaporizes Trigon with a pure-white version of her soul-self, returning the world to normal in the process. In the fifth season of the show, she becomes more open and friendly, although her disposition to Beast Boy does not change.
 Raven returns in the New Teen Titans shorts; and in one, she goes on a date with the Goth Boy.
 Raven appears in Teen Titans Go!. While her appearance remains mostly unchanged from the original Teen Titans series, her hair is now black with purple streaks instead of purple. This version of Raven is significantly more chatty and sociable than in her original series appearance, although she does occasionally show her dark side, mostly when provoked or agitated. In "Legendary Sandwich", it is revealed that she loves the show Pretty Pretty Pegasus (a parody of My Little Pony, for which Strong voices Twilight Sparkle) but dislikes other "girly" things like flowers, hearts, chocolates, and rabbits. Similar to the comics, Beast Boy has a crush on Raven, which culminates in an actual mutual attraction in "Rocks and Water". They formally become an on and off couple in the double episode "BBRae", which is titled after their ship name used by their fans as a couple. She has another superhero identity called "Lady Legasus", clad in gold with powerful legs.
 Raven appears as a non-speaking cameo in the DC Super Friends short.
 Raven appears in the DC Super Hero Girls season 4 two-part finale "Nevermore", in which her demon father is having use her magic to open a portal to Metropolis. She returns in the spin-off feature Legends of Atlantis, where she employs her 2003 series' trademark incantation "Azarath, Metrion, Zinthos".
 Raven appears in the OK K.O.! Let's Be Heroes crossover special "Crossover Nexus". This marks the first time her character has appeared in a non-DC property.
Raven was slated to appear as a supporting character in a planned Nightwing  animated series.
 Raven appeared on the 2019 series DC Super Hero Girls with Tara Strong reprising her role.

Film
 Raven appears in the Teen Titans animated series film adaptation Teen Titans: Trouble in Tokyo, voiced again by Tara Strong.
 Raven appears as a main character in the animated film Justice League vs. Teen Titans, voiced by Taissa Farmiga. She is the center of the story as it revolves around her father, Trigon, attempting to conquer Earth by possessing the Justice League, using Raven as the portal. She also bonds with Damian Wayne as they recognize each other as kindred souls. This version sports the dull-tinted skin tone of her 2003 TV series' version, and at one point also employs the latter's standard spell incantation ("Azarath, Metrion, Zinthos") to effect her magic. She manages to contain Trigon in a magical crystal, which she now wears on her forehead at all times.
 Raven appears in the animated sequel Teen Titans: The Judas Contract, and is around 15/16 years old, with Farmiga reprising her role. She remains a close friend to Damian and has softened up emotionally, even cracking the occasional joke, and trying to help Terra with apparent nightmares. The end of the film see's Raven giving Damian a black dog, a great dane, he'll name Titus, as a gift. Knowing the dog will give him the unconditional love he so desperately needs, and to help him cope with the loss he feels at the end of the film.
 Raven once again appears in the animated superhero film Teen Titans Go! To The Movies as one of the main characters,being voiced by Tara Strong.
 Raven appears in the animated film Justice League Dark: Apokolips War, with Farmiga reprising her role from the previous DCAMU films. She is Damian Wayne's love interest and the two, along with Superboy, are the only surviving active Titans as most of their teammates were killed during the Paradoom invasion when defending Titans Tower. They separated after the devastation of earth due to Raven's father threatening to kill Damian repeatedly, knowing the two were in love with each other. They eventually reunite after two years, as the remaining hero's and villains team up for one more shot at defeating Darkseid. Their feelings for each other never changed and Damian eventually confesses he wanted her to co-lead the League of Assassin's because he loved her and she confesses the real reason they had to separate. They finally accept their deep bond and feelings before the final mission. After Damian is killed in battle, Raven becomes so devastated that she loses control and her father break's free. Now Trigon and Darkseid battle for supremacy as Trigon thanks his daughter for the gift of freedom and to battle a worthy foe. With her father no longer an influence making her gravely ill, she embraces Damians' charred body, declaring she loves him between tears. The combination of being cleansed of evil and finally being free to feel the full depth and power of her emotions, she is able to bring Damian back from the dead with the immense powers she now yields. In the last scene of the film, as Flash is going to reset all the damage caused by Darkseid, the two share a heartfelt kiss, hoping to meet again if the chance ever came by. She, along with John Constantine and Superman, are one of the protagonists, with her struggles to keep Trigon contained a recurring conflict in the movie.

 The Teen Titans Go! and original Teen Titans animated series versions of Raven appear in Teen Titans Go! vs. Teen Titans, with Tara Strong reprising the role for both. In addition, several alternate versions of Raven appear throughout the film, which include her counterparts from Tiny Titans, the New Teen Titans comic, and the DC Animated Movie Universe.
 Raven appears in the animated film adaptation of Injustice, but with no speaking lines. As in the Year 1 comic book series, Raven helps on the hunt for Mirror Master by forcing him out of the Mirror Dimension.
 Raven appears in Teen Titans Go! & DC Super Hero Girls: Mayhem in the Multiverse, with Tara Strong reprising her voice role from various DC media.

Miscellaneous
 In the four-issue miniseries Smallville: Harbinger, a young girl is kidnapped by Brother Blood to be used as an offering to summon the Sons of Trigon, the Seven Deadly Sins. The ritual is interrupted by Zatanna and Constantine. Zatanna frees the girl but Constantine runs away with the artifact he had been looking for; the Book of Magick. Brother Blood succeeds in summoning the Seven Sins using himself as a sacrifice, and the Sins chase after Zatanna and the girl. Constantine, seeing the spirits of those who have been killed because of him, changes his mind and uses Brother Blood's heart to defeat them. Later, Zatanna places the girl under Jay Garrick's care. When Speedy asks what to call her, she tells her name, "Rachel Roth", before concluding, "...but you can call me Raven".

Video games
 Raven is a playable character in the Teen Titans Game Boy Advance and console video games, with Tara Strong reprising her role in the latter.
 Raven appears in DC Universe Online, voiced by Adriene Mishler. She has been possessed by her father Trigon as a part of a demonic invasion of Metropolis and Earth, using Raven. Hero and Villain players will fight with, or against the Titans to either free or keep Raven under Trigon's control. If she is freed, she will join Hero players along with Zatanna, and Doctor Fate in battling Brother Blood, who is the catalyst for Trigon's invasion. Through small info clips found throughout the game, the player will learn that Circe is quite aggravated that Raven refuses to give in and desires her punished once she has what she wants, while Wonder Woman considers her a true hero for containing the dark forces within her and continuing the struggle against it. Outside of the main story, Raven is located in the Watchtower's Magic Wing where she is a vendor of the Tier 1 armor set for the magically aligned heroes. If clicked repeatedly, she will remark on how she is not always sarcastic when she speaks.
 Raven is a playable character in Injustice: Gods Among Us, with Tara Strong once again reprising her role but with a deeper and more demonic sounding voice (although a trailer featuring Green Lantern in Story Mode had her with the same voice as the television incarnation, suggesting that Strong's voice was filtered). Trigon appears as part of her super attack, and the Regime's Raven notes in a confrontation with Wonder Woman that she serves her world's Superman as Superman's actions will aid in her father's return. In her single player ending, the "normal" Raven, after having expended a large amount of demonic energy defeating Superman, realizes too late that she has summoned her father Trigon into the world. Thanking her, he summons an army of demons and sets about conquering the world.
 Raven appears as a downloadable playable character in LEGO Batman 3: Beyond Gotham.
 The Teen Titans Go! incarnation appears as a playable character in Lego Dimensions, with Tara Strong reprising her role.
 Raven makes a cameo in Starfire's ending in Injustice 2 as the latter has a flashback of the Titans celebrating their victories. Starfire mentions that Raven's no longer with them as she's now become a servant of Trigon.
 Raven appears as a playable character in Lego DC Super-Villains, voiced again by Tara Strong. Just like Beast Boy, she is a boss in the second part of the level “S.T.A.R.S in your Eyes”, where she and Beast Boy try to stop the villains while Reverse-Flash is using the Cosmic Treadmill to travel to Earth-3 to find evidence on the Justice Syndicate being villains, but is defeated as well as Beast Boy.
 Raven appears as a cosmetic costume in Fortnite, with three styles in total. Raven's default style is based on her appearance in the Rebirth series, her second look is based on her classic appearance, and the last style based on her civilian appearance as Rachel Roth.

See also
 List of DC Comics characters

References

External links
 Titans Tower: Raven 

Characters created by George Pérez
Characters created by Marv Wolfman
Comics characters introduced in 1980
DC Comics characters who can move at superhuman speeds
DC Comics characters who can teleport
DC Comics characters who have mental powers
DC Comics characters who use magic
DC Comics characters with superhuman strength
DC Comics child superheroes
DC Comics demons
DC Comics female superheroes
DC Comics female supervillains
DC Comics hybrids
DC Comics martial artists
DC Comics superheroes
DC Comics supervillains
DC Comics telekinetics
DC Comics telepaths
Fictional characters who can manipulate darkness or shadows
Fictional characters who can manipulate reality
Fictional characters who can manipulate time
Fictional characters who can turn intangible
Fictional characters with anti-magic or power negation abilities
Fictional characters with dimensional travel abilities
Fictional characters with electric or magnetic abilities
Fictional characters with elemental and environmental abilities
Fictional characters with elemental transmutation abilities
Fictional characters with energy-manipulation abilities
Fictional characters with fire or heat abilities
Fictional characters with healing abilities
Fictional characters with precognition
Fictional deicides
Fictional empaths
Fictional half-demons
Fictional mass murderers
Fictional offspring of rape
Fictional polyglots
Fighting game characters
Mythology in DC Comics
Teenage superheroes